Antonio Insfrán (born 17 January 1942) is a Paraguayan footballer. He played in 14 matches for the Paraguay national football team from 1961 to 1967. He was also part of Paraguay's squad for the 1963 South American Championship.

References

External links
 

1942 births
Living people
Paraguayan footballers
Paraguay international footballers
Place of birth missing (living people)
Association football defenders